Swimming at the 2014 Southeast Asian Swimming Championships was held 14–24 June in Singapore. It consisted of 41 events, swum in a long course (50m) pool. 4 disciplines of swimming, diving, water polo and synchronised swimming, with over 200 participants from 7 countries.

Swimming Medals 
Medals:

Diving Medals

Waterpolo Medals 

 Men's U23 :  / 
 Women's :  / /

Synchronised swimming

References

2014 in swimming
Swimming competitions in Asia